Abisara caeca is a butterfly and belongs to the Genus Abisara in the family Riodinidae. It is found in Cameroon, Gabon, the Republic of the Congo, Angola, the Democratic Republic of the Congo, Uganda and Tanzania. The habitat consists of swamp forests.

Subspecies
Abisara caeca caeca (Democratic Republic of the Congo: Uele, Ituri and Kivu, south-western Uganda, north-western Tanzania)
Abisara caeca semicaeca Riley, 1932 (Cameroon, Gabon, Congo, western Democratic Republic of the Congo, possibly Angola)

References

Butterflies described in 1914
Abisara
Butterflies of Africa